|}

The Prix de Reux is a Group 3 flat horse race in France open to thoroughbreds aged three years or older. It is run over a distance of 2,500 metres (about 1 mile and  furlongs) at Deauville in early August.

History
The event is named after Reux, a commune located to the south of Deauville. In the early part of the 20th century, it was a 1,000-metre race for two-year-olds.

The Prix de Reux became an open-age race over 2,600 metres in 1925. From this point it could serve as a trial for the Grand Prix de Deauville.

The race was held at Maisons-Laffitte on several occasions during World War II. It was cut to 2,500 metres in the 1970s.

For a period the event held Listed status. It was promoted to Group 3 level in 2013.

Records
Most successful horse since 1979 (2 wins):
 Magadino – 2006, 2008

Leading jockey since 1979 (5 wins):
 Olivier Peslier – Dark Moondancer (1998), First Magnitude (1999), Epitre (2000), Fair Mix (2002), Tiberian (2017)

Leading trainer since 1979 (10 wins):
 André Fabre – Village Star (1987), Swain (1995), Water Poet (1996), First Magnitude (1999), Epitre (2000), Martaline (2004), Short Pause (2005), Poet Laureate (2007), Ideal World (2009), Tenenbaum (2012)

Leading owner since 1979 (4 wins):
 Khalid Abdullah – Regency (1994), Martaline (2004), Short Pause (2005), Ideal World (2009)

Winners since 1979

Earlier winners

 1925: Cerfeuil
 1926: Sang Froid
 1927: Take My Tip
 1928: Huntersdale
 1929: Licteur
 1930: Motrico
 1931: Rieur
 1932: Biltzalia
 1933: Romarin
 1934: Dark Pacha
 1935: Jumbo
 1936: Prince Rouge
 1937: Magour
 1938: Cardon
 1939: Ribera
 1941: Oxalis *
 1942: Massinor *
 1943: Oxyde *
 1954: Arenys
 1971: Uncanny
 1972: Relate
 1973: Primette
 1976: Ashmore
 1977: Campero

* The 1941, 1942 and 1943 runnings took place at Maisons-Laffitte.

See also
 List of French flat horse races

References

 France Galop / Racing Post:
 , 
 horseracingintfed.com – International Federation of Horseracing Authorities – Prix de Reux (2017).
 pedigreequery.com – Prix de Reux – Deauville.

Open middle distance horse races
Deauville-La Touques Racecourse
Horse races in France